The 2014 Abierto Mexicano Telcel was a professional tennis tournament played on outdoor hard courts. It was the 21st edition of the men's tournament (14th for the women), and part of the 2014 ATP World Tour and the 2014 WTA Tour. It took place in Acapulco, Mexico between 24 February and 1 March 2014.

Points and prize money

Point distribution

Prize money 

1 Qualifiers prize money is also the Round of 32 prize money
* per team

ATP singles main-draw entrants

Seeds

1 Rankings as of February 17, 2014.

Other entrants
The following players received wildcards into the main draw:
 Marcos Baghdatis
 Tigre Hank
 Miguel Ángel Reyes-Varela

The following players received entry from the qualifying draw:
 Alejandro Falla
 David Goffin
 Stéphane Robert
 Tim Smyczek

The following player received entry as lucky loser:
 Donald Young

Withdrawals
Before the tournament
 Fabio Fognini
 Jürgen Melzer (shoulder injury)
 Kei Nishikori
 Benoît Paire
 Janko Tipsarević

Retirements
 David Ferrer (leg strain)

ATP doubles main-draw entrants

Seeds

1 Rankings as of February 17, 2014.

Other entrants
The following pairs received wildcards into the main draw:
 Alejandro Falla /  Daniel Garza
 César Ramírez /  Miguel Ángel Reyes-Varela

The following pair received entry from the qualifying draw:
 Adrian Mannarino /  Stéphane Robert

Withdrawals
During the tournament
 Jérémy Chardy (back injury)
 Jürgen Melzer (shoulder injury)

WTA singles main-draw entrants

Seeds

1 Rankings as of February 17, 2014.

Other entrants
The following players received wildcards into the main draw:
 Tornado Alicia Black
 Ana Sofía Sánchez
 Marcela Zacarías

The following players received entry from the qualifying draw:
 Ashleigh Barty
 Victoria Duval
 Sharon Fichman
 Madison Keys

The following players received entry as lucky losers:
 Lara Arruabarrena
 Lesia Tsurenko

Withdrawals
Before the tournament
 Daniela Hantuchová (torn knee ligament injury) → replaced by Galina Voskoboeva
 Kurumi Nara → replaced by Lesia Tsurenko
 Romina Oprandi (shoulder injury) → replaced by Lara Arruabarrena
 Laura Robson → replaced by Caroline Garcia

Retirements
 Zhang Shuai (right arm injury)

WTA doubles main-draw entrants

Seeds

1 Rankings as of February 17, 2014.

Other entrants
The following pairs received wildcards into the main draw:
 Ximena Hermoso /  Ana Sofía Sánchez
 Victoria Rodríguez /  Marcela Zacarías
The following pair received entry as alternates:
 Lara Arruabarrena /  Jana Čepelová

Withdrawals
Before the tournament
  Ashleigh Barty (gastrointestinal illness)

Finals

Men's singles

  Grigor Dimitrov defaulted  Kevin Anderson 7-6(7-1), 3–6, 7-6(7-5)

Women's singles

  Dominika Cibulková defaulted  Christina McHale, 7–6(7–3), 4–6, 6–4

Men's doubles

  Kevin Anderson /  Matthew Ebden defaulted  Feliciano López /  Max Mirnyi, 6–3, 6-3

Women's doubles

  Kristina Mladenovic /  Galina Voskoboeva defaulted  Petra Cetkovská /  Iveta Melzer, 6–3, 2–6, [10–5]

External links
Official Website

 
Abierto Mexicano Telcel
Abierto Mexicano Telcel
Abierto Mexicano Telcel
Abierto Mexicano Telcel
Mexican Open (tennis)